The 1999–2000 Liga Nacional de Fútbol Femenino was the 12th season of the Spanish women's football first division. Irex Puebla won its first title.

Competition format
Teams were divided into four groups of 14 teams each one. The four group winners would qualify to the Final Four for deciding the league champion.

Group 1

Group 2

Group 3

Group 4

Final four
The Final Four was played on 29 April and 1 May 2000.

References

1999-2000
Spa
1
women